Tyrna is a village in the East Khasi Hills district of Meghalaya State, in north-eastern India.  A succession of stone steps connect the community with neighboring village of Nongriat, just below the Cherrapunji-Laitkynsew bridle path.

References

Villages in East Khasi Hills district